Maria Yurievna Sergeeva (born February 7, 2001, in St.Petersburg, Russia) is a Russian individual rhythmic gymnast. She is the 2018 Grand Prix Final All-around bronze medalist. On the junior level, she is the 2016 European Junior Hoop champion. At national level she is the 2016 Russian Junior all-around bronze medalist.

Personal life
Maria has a twin sister, Anastasia Sergeeva, who is also a rhythmic gymnast.

Career

Junior 
Sergeeva and her twin sister were enrolled to a gymnastics club in St.Petersburg by their mother; her first coach was Irina Pomysova,  later she would join the official team in St. Petersburg after being noticed by Amina Zaripova, not long after she was invited by Zaripova to train in Russia's national center in Novogorsk.

She competed in the prestigious Russian rhythmic gymnastics competition at the 2014 Hope of Russia, where she won the all-around bronze.
Sergeeva made her junior international debut at the 2015 Moscow Junior Grand Prix. Sergeeva won silver in all-around at the 2015 Budapest Junior World Cup and with Team Russia winning the gold (with teammates Alina Ermolova, Daria Pridannikova and Anna Sokolova). She also won team gold (with Daria Pridannikova, Alina Ermolova, Anna Sokolova) at the Junior World Cup in Kazan. She finished 8th in the all-around at the 2015 Russian Junior Championships.

In 2016 Season, Sergeeva won the all-around bronze at the 2016 Russian Junior Championships. She competed at the Brno Junior Grand Prix winning team silver and at the Junior World Cup in Guadalajara, she won silver in team and event finals: gold in rope, clubs and silver in hoop. She was selected to compete at the 2016 European Junior Championships where she won team gold (with Alina Ermolova and Polina Shmatko), she qualified in hoop finals and won the gold medal. On September 9–11, Sergeeva together with seniors Margarita Mamun and Aleksandra Soldatova represented team Gazprom at the annual 2016 Aeon Cup in Tokyo, where they won the team gold and with Sergeeva winning the junior all-around title.

Senior 
In 2017, Sergeeva made her senior debut in the season competing at the Moscow International tournament. She then competed at the MTM Ljubljana Tournament where she finished 4th in the all-around, Sergeeva qualified in the apparatus finals in ball: 4th place and ribbon: silver medal. On May 5–7, Sergeeva competed in her first World Cup event at the 2017 Sofia World Cup placing 12th in the all-around and qualifying in the hoop final finishing in 7th place.

In 2018, Sergeeva started the season with a competition at the 2018 Moscow Senior International tournament finishing 4th in the all-around behind Anastasiia Salos. Sergeeva placed 4th in the all-around behind Ekaterina Selezneva at the 2018 Russian Championships held in Sochi. She made her debut in the Grand Prix at the 2018 Kiev Grand Prix where she won bronze in all-around. She qualified to all apparatus finals, winning won gold with hoop and clubs, bronze with ball and 4th in ribbon. On April 7–8, she competed at the RG Tournament Irina Cup in Warsaw, Poland where she won gold in the all-around with a total of 71.200 points. On April 27–29, Sergeeva made her World Cup debut at the 2018 Baku World Cup where she won with a total of 69.050 ahead of Ukraine's Vlada Nikolchenko. She qualified in all apparatus finals and won gold in hoop, ribbon, silver in ball and bronze in clubs. On May 11–13, Sergeeva continued building up her success at the 2018 Portimao World Challenge Cup where she won another gold in the all-around (69.300), she qualified in all apparatus finals and won 3 gold medals in hoop(18.750), clubs (17.900), ribbon(17.700) and bronze in ball(17.750).

Routine music information

References

External links
 
 Maria Sergeeva at Gimnastika.pro 
 

Russian rhythmic gymnasts
2001 births
Living people
Gymnasts from Saint Petersburg